The Tempête class consisted of a pair of ironclad coastal-defense ships built for the French Navy in the 1870s,  and .

Design and description
They displaced  at deep load. The crew of the Tempête class numbered 7 officers and 165 enlisted men.

The Tempête class was powered by a single six-cylinder, horizontal compound-expansion steam engine that drove one propeller shaft using steam provided by four Indret cylindrical boilers.

Armament and armor
The Tempêtes carried their main battery of two Canon de  Modèle 1875 guns in a single twin-gun turret, forward of the superstructure. Defense from torpedo boats was provided by four Canon de  Modèle 1885 Hotchkiss guns and four  Hotchkiss revolving cannon. The 47 mm guns were positioned on the corners of the hurricane deck on top of the superstructure and the revolver guns were placed between them, two on each broadside.

The main deck was protected by  iron plates, as was the deck below it. The plates protecting the conning tower measured 250 mm in thickness.

Ships

Citations

Bibliography

External links

 nice picture gallery of the ships once you scroll about 2/3 down

Ships built in France
Coastal defense ships of the French Navy
 
Ship classes of the French Navy